Kanavugal Karpanaigal is a 1982 Indian Tamil-language film directed by AL.S.Kannappan, starring Sarath Babu, Roopa and Ranipadmini .

Cast

Sarath Babu
Roopa
Ranipadmini

References

1980 films
1982 films
1980s Tamil-language films
Films scored by Gangai Amaran